EV Valley is an electric vehicle themed city and tourist attraction built by the Chinese low-speed electric vehicle company GreenWheel EV.

History

EV Valley's design was first shown at the International New Energy Auto Show of Hong Kong in 2015. It was planned to create an all-electric miniature city that would house entertainment and GreenWheel EV's production plant. The city was finished in 2017, and was the company's main production center.

Buildings

See Also
GreenWheel EV

References

Hotels in China
Amusement parks in China
Motor vehicle assembly plants in China